Flip or Flop Atlanta is a television series that originally aired on HGTV hosted by real estate agents Ken and Anita Corsini. It is a spin-off of the HGTV series Flip or Flop. It premiered on July 20, 2017 and was filmed in the Atlanta, Georgia area. On August 21, 2017, HGTV announced Flip or Flop Atlanta would be renewed for a second season, with 14 episodes, which premiered on September 13, 2018. On August 16, 2019, the Atlanta Journal-Constitution reported the show was canceled.

Premise
On March 1, 2017, HGTV announced that Flip or Flop would expand to Atlanta, Georgia. The shows will feature a new couple, Ken and Anita Corsini, flipping houses in the Atlanta, Georgia area. The Corsinis have the same roles and functions that Tarek and Christina had held previously.

A pilot episode called Flipping the South aired on HGTV in May 2016. HGTV rebranded the show as part of an expansion of the Flip or Flop franchise.

Hosts

Ken Corsini is a full-time real estate investor who lives in the suburbs of Atlanta with his wife Anita and their three children. He founded Georgia Residential Partners in 2005 and since that time has bought and sold over 500 properties.

Ken Corsini has a bachelor's degree in risk management from the University of Georgia as well as a master's degree in residential development from Georgia Tech.

Ken and Anita Corsini run a family business, renovating many houses a year in the Atlanta metro area.

Episodes

Season 1

Season 2

References

External links
Official website
Episode guide
 

Flip or Flop (franchise)
Television shows set in Atlanta
Television shows filmed in Atlanta
2017 American television series debuts
2010s American reality television series
Reality television spin-offs
2018 American television series endings
American television spin-offs